Vivian Gordon Harsh (May 27, 1890 – August 17, 1960) was an American librarian. Harsh is noted as the Chicago Public Library (CPL) system's first African American librarian, being assigned to the position on February 26, 1924. Harsh served as a librarian for 34 years until retiring in 1958.  During her career, she began an extensive archive on African American history and culture, which is now known as, the Vivian G. Harsh Research Collection, at the CPL.

Background

Born in Chicago, Illinois to a family described as “blueblood” by the Chicago Defender in its obituary for Harsh. Harsh's mother was one of the first female graduates of the historically black Fisk University in Tennessee and her father owned a saloon. Harsh attended Wendell Phillips Academy High School located in the Bronzeville neighborhood on the city's south side (which would later produce numerous other famous alumni, from Sam Cooke to the first Harlem Globetrotters). Harsh first began working for the Chicago Public Library as a junior clerk in 1909. She later went on to graduate from Simmons College Library School in Boston, Massachusetts. 

Harsh was named director of the new George Cleveland Hall branch in 1932. Harsh's goal for Hall Library when she became director was to have it serve as a community gathering space and to provide educational outreach opportunities. As a librarian, she was passionate about collecting works about African Americans and she traveled extensively throughout the South finding books to add to her collection. Harsh assembled the "Special Negro Collection" at the library, which drew a large number of diverse readers and researchers to the library.

Additionally, in her role as the director of Hall Library, Harsh organized community programs such as black history clubs, literary study clubs, a literature forum, art exhibits, storytelling sessions, drama clubs, a senior citizen’s group, and debates, all with the assistance of black children's librarian Charlemae Hill Rollins. 

The literature forum Harsh created met twice a month and provided community members a place to come and listen to book reviews or lectures given by fellow community members. Langston Hughes, Zora Neale Hurston, Gwendolyn Brooks, Arna Bontemps, Horace Clayton, and Margaret Walker were among the people who participated in these forums. The Hall Library's role as a meeting place for African-American thinkers and activists had a profound impact on the surrounding Bronzeville neighborhood in Chicago in the 1930s and 1940s. Harsh retired as director of Hall Library in 1958.

Personal and death
Harsh suffered romantic heartbreak and never married. Harsh died on August 17, 1960, aged 70 in Chicago, Illinois.

Legacy

Vivian G. Harsh Research Collection of Afro-American History and Literature

The collection Harsh started has been renamed the Vivian G. Harsh Research Collection of Afro-American History and Literature and is now located at the Woodson Regional Library just east of Beverly, Chicago. Today, the Harsh collection contains rare books, current and historical periodicals, microfilm collections, and archival document collections. The holdings include: the Timuel D. Black Papers, the William McBride Jr. Papers, the Richard Wright  Papers, and the Patricia Lidell Researchers Archives, among other African-American activists, authors, educators, and organizations with ties to the city of Chicago. The Harsh also regularly exhibits items of particular interest. Recent exhibits include selections from the Timuel D. Black Papers and the Reverend Addie Wyatt Papers. Today, the Vivian G. Harsh Collection is the largest African American history and literature collection in the Midwest, it was once called the "Black Jewel of the Midwest."

References

External links
 George Cleveland Hall branch
 Vivian G. Harsh Research Collection of Afro-American History and Literature
 Vivian G. Harsh Society
 Woodson Regional Library Featured Collections
Flashback: A heroine to history: Vivian Harsh, Chicago’s first black librarian, preserved black history, literature with massive collection
The Chicago Librarian Who Created a Lauded Collection of African American History and Literature

1890 births
1960 deaths
People from Chicago
American librarians
American women librarians
African-American librarians
20th-century African-American women
20th-century African-American people
Chicago Public Library